Horsfield's treeshrew (Tupaia javanica), also called Javan treeshrew, is a treeshrew species within the Tupaiidae. It is endemic to the Indonesian islands of Sumatra, Bali, Java and Nias where it inhabits foremost primary forest.

It was first described by Thomas Horsfield in 1822.
Several subspecies have been proposed based on variation in colouration; however, colour is an unreliable distinguishing character.

Behavior and ecology
Horsfield's treeshrew eats fruits and insects while mostly consuming arthropods. It plays a significant role in ecosystem as it controls insects and spreads plants seeds. Horsfield's treeshrew has a special ability to adapt to the agroforestry system.

References

External links 

Treeshrews
Mammals of Indonesia
Mammals described in 1822
Taxonomy articles created by Polbot